Paul Jaeg (born Paul Gamsjäger 1949 in Gosau, Austria) is an Austrian artist and writer.

Biography 
Paul Jaeg is a compositor, artist and writer in the German language. Between 1991 and 2005 he had 51 exhibitions of his artistic works in Austria and Bavaria (26 personal exhibitions, 25 in collaboration with other artists), e.g., in the City Museum of Bad Ischl, in the Egon Schiele Art Centrum, in Český Krumlov, the Künstlerhaus in Salzburg, and the Johannes Kepler University of Linz. In 1999 he received a subsidy for literature from the province of Upper Austria.

Jaeg is the editor of the cultural magazine arovell-kulturzeitschrift and the proprietor and publisher of the publishing house Arovell Verlag. As an artist, he developed the so-called "aloquart" conception. Jaeg is a member of the Austrian writers' association Grazer Autorenversammlung, and since 2009 curator of the House of Arts Deutschvilla in Strobl am Wolfgangsee. Also since 2009 he is a member of the artists' group Sinnenbrand.

Works 
Andere und andere, poetry, Salzburg 1995
Trotz A bis Z, short novel, Salzburg 1995
Wandere und wandere, poetry, Gosau 1996
Rare Beime und Reime, poetry, Gosau 1997
Ausdruck geben, stories, Gosau 1998
Nur Lust ist nicht zu fassen, short novel, Salzburg 1998
Schandsand im Gewand, stories, Gosau 1998
Die schwarze Scheide, short novel, Gosau 1998
Der Landwiener Thomas Bernhard, Scheuring 2000
Tetralogie (4 Reiseromane), novels, Scheuring 2000
Verknüpft gefragt, poetry and prose, Gosau 2001
Alles noch unerlebt, prose, Gosau 2003
Es zieht in Österreich, prose, Gosau 2005
Dachstein und Gosautal, essay, Gosau 2008
Hochmotiviert & niederträchig, poetry, Gosau 2008
Werke – Worte, paintings, Gosau 2009
Gosingerisch, dictionary of the dialect of the country around Gosau, Gosau 2009
abtasten oder zuwarten, Lyrik, Gosau 2011

References

External links 
 
 Website of the author

Austrian male artists
Austrian male writers
German-language writers
1949 births
Living people
People from Gmunden District